Evgeni Irshai (Slovak transcription Jevgenij Iršai) (b. 15 January 1951 in Leningrad, now St. Petersburg) is a Slovak composer.

From 1969 to 1975 he studied at the Conservatoire in Leningrad. In 1991 he moved to Slovakia and began to work with the theatre and Conservatoire at Banska Bystrica. Since 2001 he has been a teacher at the Academy of Performing Arts in Bratislava, where he was appointed Professor in 2010.

Irshai's compositions include chamber and orchestral music, including a number of concertante works. amongst the latter are Ma'ariv for cello and string orchestra (2013), a meditation on a Jewish prayer.

See also

Irshai, Ma'ariv, played by Jozef Lupták (cello) and the Elbląg Chamber Orchestra conducted by Paweł Kotla (YouTube).

References

Notes

Sources

Slovak composers
Male composers
20th-century composers
21st-century composers
1951 births
Russian composers
Musicians from Saint Petersburg
Living people
Slovak male musicians
Academic staff of the Academy of Performing Arts in Bratislava